Epeoloides pilosulus is one of only two species in the bee genus Epeoloides; it is cleptoparasitic in the nests of melittid bees of the genus Macropis. Known to exist in only a handful of localities in the northeastern United States and adjacent parts of Canada, this species is classified as Endangered by the State of Connecticut.

History and status
This species was once widely distributed in the northern and eastern United States and southern Canada, but virtually no records existed after 1960, leading to speculation that this species was extinct, until it was found in 2002 in Nova Scotia, and more recently from a power line right-of-way in Connecticut. In 2019 while surveying pollinators as part of an inventory of native bees in the Great Lakes region, three males were found in the Chequamegon-Nicolet National Forest near Lakewood, Wisconsin.

References

Apinae
Insects of Canada
Insects described in 1878
Taxa named by Ezra Townsend Cresson